Filly Funtasia is a computer-animated fantasy television series created by Jacob and Henrik Andersen for Dracco. The series follows filly Rose and her friends as they attend a magical academy in the royal kingdom of Funtasia. It is based on the Filly toy franchise. The series was originally produced by Dracco Brands, BRB Internacional, Screen 21, and Black Dragon Entertainment, but the latter three companies dropped out of producing the series around 2016, and the former dropped out in 2019. Guangzhou Huamai Animation Studios, B-Water Animation Studios, and Zhaolong Culture joined production much later and managed to complete what the other studios left behind.

After five years of development hell starting from 2014 when Filly Funtasia was originally supposed to premiere, the series finally premiered on March 11, 2019, on Frisbee in Italy. The series also premiered on November 28, 2019, on iQiyi in China.

The show was renewed for a second season that was released on iQiyi on December 25, 2020. In early 2021, an earlier produced English version of the series started streaming on the KidsFlix and MyToonz apps in the United States for three episodes.

On March 3, 2022, the series officially premiered with a finalized English version on Channel 5 in Singapore, with episodes being made available on their meWATCH VOD.

Plot
Filly Funtasia is about the adventures of Rose, a unicorn filly who attends the Royal Magic Academy in the kingdom of Funtasia. Her best friends – Bella, an elf filly, Lynn, a witchy filly, Will, a fairy filly, and Cedric, a royale filly, accompany her as they go to the extraordinary school to improve their magical skills, be it mixing unpredictable potions or casting spells. Rose also has to deal with everyday teenage school life while learning about the magical world around her.

Inside the basement of the academy lives Wranglum, an evil tree-like wizard creature who is trapped inside a "dark mirror", or a crystal prison. Battiwigs, a bat who is Will and Cedric's dorm pet, secretly works for Wranglum as his bumbling minion and carries his master around. Wranglum and Battiwigs plot various schemes to try and steal any crystals from the academy they can so that they can use their magic to rule over Funtasia.

Characters

Main
 Rose is the main protagonist and a caring, young unicorn who tries to be good at everything she does.
 Bella, short for Isabella is a talented elf who loves nature and finds beauty in everyone.
 Lynn is a high-spirited witch from the Witchy Kingdom (Zimsala).
 Will, short for Willow is a daring fairy who likes to play pranks, and is friends with Lynn.
 Cedric is an intelligent prince, and an inventor.

The villains
 Wranglum is the main villain of the series. He is a tree-like wizard creature who is trapped inside a crystal prison that takes the form of a mirror. He is determined to rule Funtasia by any means necessary.
 Battiwigs is a bat serving as both Will and Cedric's dorm pet, and undercover as Wranglum's minion.

Recurring
 Miss Sparkle is the headmistress of the academy.
 Twilight is a fairy filly. She is one of the teachers and Zack's boss.
 Zack is the top student of the academy and Twilight's intern. Rose has a crush on him.
 Fabian is a new student at the academy. He is a lover of geology, and is often clumsy.
 Bijou the owl is the dorm pet of Rose.
 Zam and Zamie are two elf twins in the academy. They are normally seen causing trouble, especially for Will.

Production
Filly Funtasia was created by Danish brothers, Jacob and Henrik Ranis Stokholm Andersen, who also founded the Filly franchise around 2006, and serve as the directors of the series. Development began during the summer of 2012, and Tine S. Norbøll, the developer of the franchise, wrote the story bible for series. She was also an art director for the show, though her work is uncredited. BRB Internacional and their animation studio Studio 21 originally did the animation work, with some outsourcing from Black Dragon Entertainment in China.

Some notable BRB staff who worked on the show include Stevepeig, who designed some of the concept art and how scenes would act out, and Dani Canovas, who designed some of the main characters such as Rose and Will, and did the color script for some scenes, as well as the backgrounds.

On October 12, 2012, plans for an animated TV series based on the Filly franchise were announced, with the working title of "Filly", and the series was set to premiere worldwide in 2014. A teaser for the show was presented at MIPTV in April 2013. On May 29, 2013, the show was renamed to Filly Funtasia, and some of the writers for the show were revealed; Dean Stefan, Noelle Wright, Jymn Magon, Johnny Hartmann, and Sean Derek. BRB Internacional was to distribute the show internationally, except in Germany where Dracco would handle it.

A trailer for the show was uploaded officially by BRB to YouTube on October 15, 2013. Another trailer was released to Twitter on April 11, 2014, featuring clips synced to the show's ending theme, "From Now Until Forever". A third one was released on October 13, 2014, by Funtasia Daily, for BRB offered them the chance to release it to reach a wider audience. A fourth trailer for the show was presented at MIPCOM 2015 and was released on October 6, 2015, featuring clips from the show synced to the show's opening theme, "Magical World".

Two 75-minute specials of the show were announced April 4, 2016, at the MIPTV Media Market titled "Filly Stars" and "Filly Butterfly". Originally produced by BRB's 3D movie division, Apolo Films, no news has surfaced about the current state of the specials and whether they have been cancelled or not as of late. They were meant to be released before the show in order to explain the characters and the world, which explains why Filly Funtasia starts off with no proper introduction.

Later in 2016, BRB and Screen 21 stopped working on the show, and stopped publicly associating with it. It can be assumed that around this time, Black Dragon also quit too. Around 2018, Spanish company B-Water Animation Studios and Hong Kong-based company Guangzhou Huamai Animation Studios joined the production of the series, and worked to complete what the previous studios had left behind. A fifth trailer for the show, which would be the first Filly Funtasia material in a few years, would be released to Vimeo on March 23, 2018, by B-Water. It would also be the last trailer of the show to be released before its premiere one year later.

Filly Funtasia has gone through development hell five years prior to its release, and was delayed many times before it finally premiered in 2019. While the reasons for the delay remain unclear, it likely includes financial problems the Andersen brothers were facing, BRB and Screen 21 suddenly ceasing production of the series on their part, and Dracco initiating legal action against Simba Dickie Group. In the final version of both the English and Chinese credits, nobody from either BRB and Screen 21 or Black Dragon have been credited since those companies backed out of their involvement with the series. While English is the original version of the series, it was not released officially anywhere until 2021; however, various English trailers were released prior. The latest trailers posted by Imira Entertainment in 2019 contain the finalized voices, while the previous trailers released by BRB in 2014 featured different voices. Irish actor Morgan C. Jones, who works for Telegael, has participated in voicing characters in one of the English versions.

On January 17, 2020, the series was renewed for a second season that was released to iQiyi on December 25, 2020. A trailer for it was posted on November 2, 2020, on the show's official Weibo account.  Several Chinese sources mentioned the plans on the third season of the show to be created and released in late 2021, which has since been delayed to an unannounced date, but merchandise and promotion both online and offline are slowly happening meanwhile.

Dracco Brands dropped out of the show in season 2, to be replaced by Zhaolong Culture in 2019. Zhaolong would fund the production of seasons 1 and 2.“Filly Funtasia” animations and films are invested, planned and operated by Zhaolong Culture Technology (Guangzhou) Co., Ltd. Zhaolong owns full copyright of Filly Funtasia, including copyright, distribution right, image right, merchandising right, etc. The series is distributed by Imira Entertainment, which is owned by Toonz Media Group.

Episodes

Series overview

Season 1 (2019)

Season 2 (2020)

The second season of the series was released on December 25, 2020. The worldwide premiere for the season was on iQiyi, and unlike the previous season, all episodes were released on the same day.

Broadcast

Filly Funtasia was originally planned to be released in early 2014, but was delayed to the fourth quarter of 2014. On March 30, 2014, the release date of the show was delayed again to 2015. It was announced that the show would air on Clan in Spain, and later on V-me in the US. The show was delayed again on January 19, 2015, for a 2016 release. On March 10, 2015, it was announced that Filly Funtasia would air on K2 in Italy. On January 16, 2018, the Andersen brothers discussed in an interview that the series was postponed once again for a 2019 release.

The series eventually premiered worldwide in Italian on March 11, 2019, on Frisbee in Italy. In China, the series was officially released with a Mandarin Chinese dub onto iQiyi, with the title The Colorful Wonderland of the Little Fillys, on November 28, 2019. The show had reached more than 2800 viewers in under 24 hours. Later, the series would have its TV premiere on Hunan TV Golden Eagle Cartoon on January 20, 2020. Each of the 13 episodes are split into two 12 to 13-minute episodes, unlike how the show would be broadcast nearly worldwide; the episode order of season two is also specifically different than its intended order.

In Ukraine, the series premiered on November 30, 2019, on PLUSPLUS with a Ukrainian dub. Filly Funtasia premiered on September 5, 2020, on Minimax in Hungary, the 7th in Romania and Moldova, the 16th in the Czech Republic, and October 3 in Serbia and Slovenia. Minimax premiered season two in 2021, with its premiere for Hungary on February 6, Czech Republic on February 11, and Serbia with Slovenia on February 15. In Romania, the season premiered later on April 18, 2021.

The series premiered on Arutz HaYeladim in Israel in November 2020, and the two seasons are currently available on the streaming service, BIGI. On February 15, 2021, the series premiered on La Tele Tuya in Venezuela in Latin American Spanish; season two premiered in early June of the same year; like China, season two was released by La Tele Tuya in a very different order as compared to the rest of the world. The series also airs in Latin American Spanish on Clan Internacional worldwide, including Latin America and the United States.

Thai dub started airing on True Spark Play (owned by TrueVisions) on April 20, 2022, and German dub is expected to premiere on Junior starting June 6 (latter will air the show halving each episode, just like China).
First mention of possibility of a Thai version was Chinese 'overseas broadcasts' poster for iABC awards article   that also had flags of Spain and Denmark (Castilian Spanish and Danish dubs still weren't revealed) and lacked German flag. 
On May 9, 2022, Studio 100's channel on Vimeo updated with the trailer of the dub and a web page on TV channel's site was revealed.

Since around January 2021, three episodes in English ("Hide and Seek", "The Lost Mermaid", and "Farina, the Fire Dragon") were eventually made available in the United States on the KidsFlix and MyToonz apps, as well as online streaming; both services are owned by Toonz Media Group. These episodes are also available to stream on the Airtel Xstream service in India through KidsFlix.

A different, finalized English release would air on Channel 5 in Singapore starting March 3, 2022, with the season 2 premiere "The Freshmen". The channel also proposes a different episode order, mixing episodes of both season one and two together (all labeled as one season). Episodes are also made available on the meWATCH VOD service after they air.

Songs
Filly Funtasia has many songs used throughout the series. Nearly all of them have served as background music at some point, playing through certain scenes with the vocals intact, but a few of them have been sung by the characters in-universe. Most of the songs were produced by Klaus Derendorf and Windy Wagner; they were not officially released in full on any soundtrack or album. Artists Drew Seeley, Maria Christensen, Jean-Yves Ducornet, and Leticia Ascencio were credited in the show as "in association with". Due to being a song from the second season, "Amigos" is sung by a different female singer. Moreover, the song "Together with You" in the English version of "The Freshmen" features yet another female lead singer (previously, it had been sung by a male).

The full versions of four songs ("Transformation", "In the Storm", "We Can Find A Way Through It All", and "From Now Until Forever") in English were released in the form of coloring sheet videos through broadcaster Minimax's sites and channels on YouTube, in late May 2021.

In addition, the regular background music heard throughout the series was composed by Giles Packham and John McPhillips. The recording studio was Waveform Studios Dublin.

Other media

Short videos
On July 13, 2021, the official Ixigua channel of Filly Funtasia in China released a short clip of 50 seconds, with an educational focus, featuring some scenes not completely taken from episodes of the show. It is called "Why do little bees collect nectar?" (小蜜蜂为什么要采蜜？), and explains to its audience how bees create the honey humans eat. It featuring the characters Cookintot, Rose and Will.

A second short video titled 金蹄杯足球大赛, uploaded on July 19, features a comical story about a match of the Hoopenhoof game.

Video games
Various games of Filly Funtasia for Android, iOS and HTML5 were made during the several years of production of the series, hosted on different sites, and using materials created for the series.

Slide puzzles were made for the show as well, but they were eventually deleted from the app store.

Merchandise
Toys of Filly Funtasia that were meant for China only, and made in partnership with Seasun were released in 2020, while the newest merchandise was released in 2021, made in accordance with both Chinese and European standards, and includes trading and collectible cards, blind bag figurines with Swarovski elements (in the style of first Filly toys) or big figurines with character cards and Preciosa elements, reused Filly Ballerina's toy set with a filly toy (and judging by iABC's article's photo, reused Filly Butterfly's toy set with a mushroom, and reused Filly Wedding toys), mirrors in two colours inspired by Bella's mirror design, various accessories for girls and soft, velvet like figurine of Rose (the only one with such surface, unlike in times of classic Filly toys).  Additionally, there are clothes for kids created by YouYouYu, pencils for school, dishware and more.

Reception

Accolades
On August 23, 2018, the episode "The Blue Rainbow" (at the time known as "The Missing Student") was nominated in the Best Animation category in the 58th Asia-Pacific Film Festival, before the series premiered. It lost to Fundamental.

Controversy
In China, mostly on Weibo where the show has an official verified account there, reception of the show has been mixed since its release there. While some have been praising it, many articles have came out claiming that the show plagiarized My Little Pony: Friendship Is Magic, as both center on colorful equines, and that it is not a real domestic Chinese cartoon due to being a co-production and being released first in Italy. They also point out that the Chinese title of the show is one character off from Friendship Is Magics.

Internet popularity
On October 16, 2013, one day after BRB Internacional had released the first trailer for Filly Funtasia on YouTube, Shaun Scotellaro of Equestria Daily had reported on the show's existence, calling Filly a "copycat brand". What resulted after were a lot of mixed reactions to the show, with many disregarding it as a My Little Pony: Friendship Is Magic rip-off before it premiered, and others claiming that it reminded them of the third generation ("G3") of My Little Pony (which wasn't typically regarded as good by bronies at that time). An intern at BRB responded calmly to a lot of the YouTube comments on the trailer that arouse from the situation before the video was privated, then unlisted with comments disabled. The show was also reported on the site in 2014 and 2015 due to the new trailers that were being released.

In the midst of the brony fandom becoming aware of the show, Funtasia Daily was created by Skundi on October 24, 2013. The intention of the site is to report on all Filly related news, much like Equestria Daily does for Friendship Is Magic. Some articles were also written by Zejgar. As a response to the 4chan and Ponychan threads on the show dying, Skundi also created Fillychan on January 24, 2015. The show would gain a minimal fanbase of its own, with some taking an ironic interest in the show. Memes about the show were prevalent at the peak of its popularity, including the frequent joke that the show was the next generation ("G5") of My Little Pony.

Tine was interviewed by Skundi of Funtasia Daily in June 2015, using questions that were asked by the community. Notably, Tine noticed the Filly Funtasia fandom and acknowledged the term "Funtasian", which would be the equivalent of bronies.

After a long period of silence, Equestria Daily would report on the show's comeback in 2019, and the reception to the show was notably more positive than it was before. One of the earliest reuploads of the first trailer of the show has over 1 million views as of February 2020.

Notes

References

External links
 
 
 Filly Funtasia on iQiyi
 Filly Funtasia on B-Water Animation Studios

2010s animated television series
2020s animated television series
2019 Chinese television series debuts
2019 Spanish television series debuts
Chinese children's animated adventure television series
Chinese children's animated comedy television series
Chinese children's animated fantasy television series
Spanish children's animated adventure television series
Spanish children's animated comedy television series
Spanish children's animated fantasy television series
Animated television series about children
Animated television series about horses
Computer-animated television series
English-language television shows
Fictional horses
Television shows based on toys
Television about unicorns
Television shows involved in plagiarism controversies